Danilo Teodoro Soares (born 29 October 1991) is a Brazilian professional footballer who plays as a left back for  club VfL Bochum.

Born in Belo Horizonte, Brazil, Soares started his career in Austria with Austria Lustenau in 2010. He joined FC Ingolstadt of the 2. Bundesliga in summer 2013 and was promoted to the Bundesliga with the club in 2015, but injury issues limited him to just a single Bundesliga appearance and his left the club at the end of the season. He spent the 2016–17 season with TSG Hoffenheim but failed to make an appearance, with Soares joining VfL Bochum in summer 2017. He was promoted to the Bundesliga with Bochum at the end of the 2020–21 season.

Career

Austria Lustenau
Born in Belo Horizonte, Soares went to schools in the Venda Nova neighbourhood of Belo Horizonte. His parents separated when he was a child and he experienced depression as a result. Having previously had an unsuccessful trial at Cruzeiro at around age 16, he spent a month on trial in the Netherlands, before signing a three-year contract with Austrian First League (second tier) club Austria Lustenau in 2010. He made 26 appearances during the 2010–11 season, 34 appearances in the 2011–12 season, and 31 appearances during the 2012–13 season, scoring once.

FC Ingolstadt
In summer 2013, Soares joined FC Ingolstadt, having signed a pre-contract agreement during the previous season. He made his debut for the club on 19 July 2013, starting in a 2–1 2. Bundesliga defeat at home to FC Erzgebirge Aue. He made 27 league appearances and two DFB-Pokal appearances across the 2013–14 season. On 2 March 2015, Soares scored his first goal for the club in a 1–1 draw with 1860 Munich. Despite suffering an injury in his left foot in early April, he appeared in 6 of 8 matches across April and May 2015, as Ingolstadt pushed for promotion. The 2014–15 season saw Ingolstadt promoted to the Bundesliga as champions of the 2. Bundesliga with 64 points. Soares started 32 of the club's 34 league matches that season, and scored once. Following the end of the season, he had surgery on his metatarsophalangeal joint, ruling him out for an extended period of time. Having returned from injury, Soares made his first Bundesliga appearance on 19 December 2015 in a 1–0 defeat to Bayer Leverkusen, and he committed to seeing out the season with Ingolstadt in January 2021. However, he did not make a further appearance during the 2015–16 season, and was released at the end of the season, with Soares continuing to suffer injury to his left toe, including the onset of osteoarthritis.

1899 Hoffenheim
After a second operation on his toe in summer 2016, following which he rehabilitated at 1899 Hoffenheim, Soares joined Hoffenheimin November 2016 on a "performance-related contract" until summer 2017. He did not play during the 2016–17 season and he left the club at the end of his contract.

VfL Bochum
In summer 2017, Soares joined 2. Bundesliga club VfL Bochum on a three-year contract following the expiry of his contract at Hoffenheim. He made his debut for the club on 28 July 2017 in a 1–0 defeat to FC St. Pauli and went on to make 30 league appearances and two cup appearances during the 2017–18 season, whilst he made 23 league and one cup appearance during the 2018–19 season. He scored his first Bochum goal on 4 November 2019 in a 3–1 win over 1. FC Nürnberg, and made 32 league appearances and two cup appearances that season. With Danilo's contract with Bochum having expired on 30 June 2020, it was announced that he had signed a new four-year contract with the club on 4 July 2020. At the end of the 2020–21 season, Bochum were promoted to the Bundesliga after finishing top of the 2. Bundesliga, with Soares having made 32 league appearances, scoring twice and providing three assists.

Career statistics

References

External links
 
 

1991 births
Living people
Brazilian footballers
Association football fullbacks
SC Austria Lustenau players
FC Ingolstadt 04 players
TSG 1899 Hoffenheim players
VfL Bochum players
2. Liga (Austria) players
Bundesliga players
2. Bundesliga players
Brazilian expatriate footballers
Expatriate footballers in Austria
Expatriate footballers in Germany
Footballers from Belo Horizonte